Boston College Main Campus Historic District encompasses the historic heart of the campus of Boston College in the Chestnut Hill area of Newton, Massachusetts.  It consists of a collection of six Gothic Revival stone buildings, centered on Gasson Hall, designed by Charles Donagh Maginnis and begun in 1909.

The district has been ambiguously listed in the National Park Service's NRIS database (the official repository for listings on the National Register of Historic Places) as "pending" since .

See also
 National Register of Historic Places listings in Newton, Massachusetts

References

External links
Boston College website

Main Campus Historic District
Chestnut Hill, Massachusetts
Geography of Newton, Massachusetts
Historic districts in Middlesex County, Massachusetts
Historic districts on the National Register of Historic Places in Massachusetts
National Register of Historic Places in Newton, Massachusetts
University and college campuses in Massachusetts